The White Nights International Marathon is an annual marathon in St. Petersburg, Russia, that takes place during the summer, when the sky is light for nearly 24 hours, though it did not take place in 2021 and 2022. In 2013, the race was the second-largest Russian marathon race in terms of finishers (the Moscow Marathon was first, the Siberian Marathon was third). The race has been a member of the Association of International Marathons and Distance Races. The race weekend consists of a 10K run and the marathon. Many participants have noted the laissez faire attitude about the race management, saying that it gives the event "the same kind of rawness of spirit that old-style marathons had." The race has also been known for lack of crowd support, minimal course administration, and salted rye bread instead of gels at water stations.

Course 
The marathon track has commonly been in one loop through the central part of the city, down streets such as Nevsky Prospect, and against the background of monuments and buildings including St. Isaac's Cathedral, The Bronze Horseman, Vasilyevsky Island's Arrow, the Peter and Paul Fortress, the Saint Petersburg Botanical Garden, the Tovstonogov Bolshoi Drama Theater, the Saint Alexander Nevsky Monastery, and others.

Prizes 
The winner of the marathon in 2013 earned 200,000 rubles.

History 
The White Nights Marathon was first held in 1990 during the White Nights Festival in Leningrad, Russia. Initially, the marathon was conceived as a night marathon—the runners started at 11 p.m. and finished the following morning.

In recent years though, the race has started at 8 a.m. Sunday morning.

No race has been held since 2020. It returns come 2023.

2007 
The XVIII edition of the race saw 1,300 runners start the marathon. Pavel Andreyev won for the men in 2:16:26, after running ahead of contenders Aleksy Veselov and Vladimir Ponomaryov. For the women, Yulia Gromova (a local runner) set a new course record with her win in 2:37:57.

2008 
The XIV edition of the race saw the men's race end in a tie. Pavel Andreyev crossed the finish hand-in-hand with Andrey Bryzgalov in 2:17:24. For the women, Natalia Sokolova won in 2:37:26.

2011 
The XXII edition took place June 26, 2011. In the marathon, 977 people finished; in the 10K run, 830 people finished. Athletes from Morocco who lived and trained in Spain won the first two places in the marathon. Abdulah Tagraft won in 2:14:12, Hasan Ahagur took second (2:14:15) in a close finish. Russian marathon runner Sergey Lukin from Toksovo finished third (2:16:48).

For the woman's marathon, Alevtina Ivanova from Yoshkar-Ola won in 2:38:26.

2012 
The XXIII White Nights International took place on July 1, 2012. The marathon race also served as the Russian Cup race. The race grew to 1,170 finishers while 987 finished the 10K. The winners of the marathon in 2012 were the runners-up from the past year: Hasan Ahagur for men, Vera Trubnikova for women. In addition, Vera Trubnikova set a course record in 2:35:35.

2013 
The XXIV version took place on June 30, 2013. This year, the marathon was sponsored by Ergo for the first time. Even more runners (1,400) from 40 countries came to St. Petersburg to start the marathon. The 10K participation grew to 1,607 finishers Kenyan Peter Kwalir took first in the marathon (2:14:30) for men, Russian Tatyana Belkina won for the women (2:44:56).

In the 10K, athletes from St. Petersburg took first: Artur Burtsev for men in 31:02 and Yulia Chizhenko for women in 33:53.

2014 
The XXV version took place June 29, 2014. Nearly 5,000 participants took part in the race weekend starting at the Palace Square. The marathon saw 2,184 finishers (1,845 men and 339 women). The 10K grew again, this year to  2,531 participants. The marathon was won by Salomon Kibet Barnetuni of Kenya in 2:16:12. Tatyana Belkina of Yekaterinburg won for women in 2:40:49. In the 10K, the last year's winners repeated: Artur Burtsev for men in 30:27 and Yulia Chizhenko for women in 34:29.

2015 
On June 28, more than 11,000 people from 54 countries took part in the XXVI marathon weekend. The winner of the marathon was Mikhail Bykov in 2:20:32. The winner of the 10K was again Artur Burtsev with a time of 30:24.

2016 

In 2016, about 4,000 athletes started at the marathon; 6,000 started the 10K. The winners of the marathon were athletes from the Samara region Yuri Mikhailovich Chechun and Nadezhda Leshchinskaya, who, despite the abnormal heat, showed fast times (2:20:27 and 2:39:57, respectively).

Marathon race results
Key:

References

External links

Recurring events established in 1990
Annual sporting events in Russia
Marathons in Russia
Summer events in Russia